Brian Connor (born 23 April 1969) is a footballer who last played for Slough Town in the English Southern Football League Division One South & West. He played international football for Anguilla.

Club career
Connor played over 300 matches for Maidenhead United, then for Hampton & Richmond Borough before joining Slough Town in 2007.

International career
Connor made his debut for Anguilla in a February 2008 World Cup qualification match against El Salvador, aged 38. He also played in the return match, his only two caps by December 2008.

References

External links
 
 
 

1969 births
Living people
People from Taplow
Anguillan footballers
English footballers
Anguilla international footballers
Maidenhead United F.C. players
Hampton & Richmond Borough F.C. players
Slough Town F.C. players
Marlow F.C. players
St Albans City F.C. players
Southern Football League players
Association football defenders